The Universe is an American documentary television series that features computer-generated imagery and computer graphics of astronomical objects in the universe plus interviews with experts who study in the fields of cosmology, astronomy, and astrophysics. The program is produced by Flight 33 Productions and Workaholic Productions.

The series premiered on May 29, 2007, on The History Channel and four subsequent seasons were aired until 2010. Starting from October 25, 2011, new episodes began airing exclusively on H2.

The series currently airs on Viceland and Story Television.

Format
The series covers topics concerning space exploration, the Solar System, and astronomical objects in the universe. It shows CGI renderings of these aforementioned, video footage, photographs, and views from scientists, project managers, engineers, advocates, writers and other experts. The episode "7 Wonders of the Solar System", and Season 6 were produced in 3D.

Episodes

Season 1: 2007

Season 2: 2007–08

Season 3: 2008–09

Season 4: 2009

Season 5: 2010

Season 6: 2011

Season 7: 2012

Season 8: 2014

Season 9: 2015

References

General references

External links

Flight 33 Productions website

History (American TV channel) original programming
2007 American television series debuts
2000s American documentary television series
2010s American documentary television series
Documentary television series about astronomy
English-language television shows
Television series by MGM Television